Douvrin is a commune in the Pas-de-Calais department in the Hauts-de-France region of France.

Geography
Since the mid-1960s, farming and light industry have replaced coal mining as the principle occupations.

History
First recorded in the eleventh century, the town has been known by several variations of the name:
Doverin (in 1098), Dovring (in 1120), Dovrin (in 1149), Dovrign (in 1218), Douvringnum (in 1229), Douvrin (in the fifteenth century) and also as Douvrain (in 1652).

The town suffered considerable damage during World War I.

Coal mining was the main livelihood here for around 100 years, from the mid-nineteenth century until the 1960s when the reserves became uneconomic.
Since 1969, Française de Mécanique, part of PSA Peugeot Citroen has produced motor-car engines at the plant immediately north of the commune. Over 3,400 people work here, producing 7000 units a week.

Population

Places of interest
 The church of Sacre-Coeur, rebuilt, as was most of the town, after World War I.

See also
Communes of the Pas-de-Calais department

References

External links

 Official Douvrin website 

Communes of Pas-de-Calais